Zero world government, Governance without government or Governance beyond the nation state  refers to a hypothetical future in which national governments have lost or are losing their power to govern, as a result of globalization increasing the power of transnational actors, where a worldwide rejection of traditional politics surrounded around the capture of hegemonic power happens, but governments instead assuming a place within various self-organizing networks. The term contrasts with that of one world government in the sense that rather than there being a  centralized world-state, there are decentralized communal anarchy without traditional governments.

See also

Utopia
Anarchism

References

World government
Futures studies
Globalization
Anarchism